The following tables compare general and technical information for several packet analyzer software utilities, also known as network analyzers or packet sniffers. Please see the individual products' articles for further information.

General information

Basic general information about the software—creator/company, license/price, etc.

Operating system support

The utilities can run on these operating systems.

References

Packet sniffers
Network analyzers